Mamchur is a Ukrainian surname. Notable people with the surname include:

 Sergei Mamchur (1972–1997), Ukrainian-Russian footballer
 Yuliy Mamchur (born 1971), Ukrainian colonel

Ukrainian-language surnames